Thomas Oliver Neville (born August 12, 1943) is a former American football offensive tackle.  He played for the American Football League's Boston Patriots from 1965 through 1969, and with the National Football League's Patriots, Denver Broncos, and New York Giants. He is a member of the Patriots All-1960s Team.

See also
 List of American Football League players

External links
NFL.com player page

1943 births
Living people
American football offensive tackles
Boston Patriots players
Denver Broncos players
New England Patriots players
New York Giants players
Mississippi State Bulldogs football players
American Football League All-Star players
Sidney Lanier High School alumni
Players of American football from Montgomery, Alabama
American Football League players